Malomusino (Bäläkäy Musa) is a rural locality (a village) in Ilkineyevsky Selsoviet, Kuyurgazinsky District, Bashkortostan, Russia. The population was 97 as of 2010. There are 3 streets.

Geography 
Malomusino is located 22 km north of Yermolayevo (the district's administrative centre) by road. Karagay is the nearest rural locality.

References 

Rural localities in Kuyurgazinsky District